X Corps was a corps of the Union Army during the American Civil War. It served during operations in South Carolina in the Department of the South, and later in Benjamin Butler's Army of the James, during the Bermuda Hundred and Petersburg Campaigns.

History
The corps was officially created on September 13, 1862, to consist of the majority of Union troops operating in South Carolina and eastern Georgia. (Other troops in Florida were officially under its command but were not effectively.) The corps was initially commanded by Ormsby M. Mitchel, who died in October 1862. He was succeeded by John Milton Brannan, David Hunter, Quincy Adams Gillmore, David B. Birney and Alfred H. Terry.

The corps took part in most of the operations against Charleston from 1862–63, including attacks on James Island and Morris Island and the Battle of Fort Wagner. Other elements of the corps based in Florida took part in the disastrous Battle of Olustee.

In early 1864, the corps, now commanded by Gillmore, was transferred to the Army of the James. It took part in the Bermuda Hundred operations and played a principal role in the disastrous Drewry's Bluff action. It also took part in the attack on Cold Harbor in conjunction with units of the Army of the Potomac, and the corps played a major role in the early stages of the Petersburg Campaign.

In December 1864, the corps was disbanded; its white contingent went to the new XXIV Corps, while its black units went to the XXV Corps. A detachment of former X Corps troops took part in the successful attack on Fort Fisher, North Carolina, in early 1865. The X Corps was "revived", under the command of Alfred Terry, in March 1865. It was attached to the Department of North Carolina under Schofield and was part of Sherman's Army after Bentonville. After Johnston's surrender, it served primarily on garrison duty in South Carolina and Georgia until it was discontinued in August 1865.

External links 
X Corps history

10
Military units and formations established in 1862
1862 establishments in the United States
Military units and formations disestablished in 1865